RMS Carmania was a Cunard Line transatlantic steam turbine ocean liner. She was launched in 1905 and scrapped in 1932. In World War I she was first an armed merchant cruiser (AMC) and then a troop ship.

When new, the pair were the largest ships in the Cunard fleet.

Building
Leonard Peskett designed Carmania. John Brown & Company built her, launching her on 21 February 1905 and completing her that November.

Carmania had three propellers, each driven by a Parsons steam turbine. A high-pressure turbine drove her centre shaft. Exhaust steam from the centre turbine powered a pair of low-pressure turbines that drove her port and starboard shafts.

Caronia, which was launched the year before, had twin propellers which were driven by quadruple-expansion engines. The essentially identical ships with the two different sets of engines was an opportunity to compare operations and clarify the advantages and disadvantages of turbine engines.

Carmanias sea trials were in November 1905. On the nautical measured mile off Skelmorlie she achieved .

Another feature that differentiated the two liners was that Carmania had two tall forward deck ventilator cowls, which were absent on Caronia.

As built, Carmania had berths for 2,650 passengers: 300 first class, 350 second class, 1,000 third class and 1,000 steerage class. Her holds included  refrigerated cargo space.

Service
Carmania left Liverpool 2 December 1905 for her maiden voyage to New York arriving 10 December. She completed the voyage in 7 days, 9 hours and 31 minutes, averaging  over the  route.

Carmania plied between Liverpool and New York from 1905 to 1910. In the spring of 1906 she took H. G. Wells to North America for the first time. He noted her size in a book about his travels, "This Carmania isn't the largest ship nor the finest, nor is to be the last. Greater ships are to follow and greater. The scale of size, the scale of power, the speed and dimensions of things about us alter remorselessly—to some limit we cannot at present descry".

In June 1910 in Liverpool Carmania suffered a major fire in her passenger accommodation. Her structure and machinery were undamaged, and repairs were completed by 4 October.

In August 1914, after the outbreak of World War I, Carmania was converted into an AMC, armed with eight QF 4.7 inch Mk V naval guns. She was commissioned as HMS Carmania, with the pennant number M 55.

Commanded by Captain Noel Grant she sailed from Liverpool to Shell Bay in Bermuda. On 14 September 1914 she engaged and sank the German merchant cruiser  in the Battle of Trindade. At the time Cap Trafalgars appearance had been altered to resemble Carmania. Carmania suffered extensive damage and several casualties to her crew.

After repairs in Gibraltar, she patrolled the coast of Portugal and the Atlantic islands for the next two years. In 1916 she assisted in the Gallipoli campaign. From July 1916 she was a troop ship. After the war she took Canadian troops home from Europe.

By 1919 she had returned to passenger liner service. In 1923 Cunard had her refitted as a cabin class ship, with her total accommodation reduced from 2,650 berths to 1,440. Caronia was similarly refitted, and the two sisters kept busy until the shipping slump caused by the Great Depression after 1929. By 1930 Carmanias navigational equipment included submarine signalling and wireless direction finding.

Fate
Toward the end of 1931 Cunard listed both Carmania and Caronia for sale. In 1932 Hughes Bolckow & Co. bought her for scrap. She arrived at Blyth on 22 April to be broken up.

Carmanias bell is on display aboard the permanently moored  at Victoria Embankment, London.

References

Bibliography

External links

 

1905 ships
World War I Auxiliary cruisers of the Royal Navy
Ocean liners of the United Kingdom
Ships built on the River Clyde
Ships of the Cunard Line
Steamships of the United Kingdom
Troop ships of the United Kingdom
World War I cruisers of the United Kingdom
World War I passenger ships of the United Kingdom